Eastleigh is a constituency represented in the House of Commons of the UK Parliament since 2019 by Paul Holmes, a Conservative.

Constituency profile
The seat forms part of the South Hampshire conurbation between Southampton and Portsmouth, including the railway town of Eastleigh itself, the postwar Hedge End and the Hamble peninsula which is known for boat building and sailing. Residents' health and wealth are around average for the UK.

Boundaries 

1955–1974: The Borough of Eastleigh, in the Rural District of New Forest the parishes of Eling and Netley Marsh, in the Rural District of Romsey and Stockbridge the parishes of Ampfield, Chilworth, North Baddesley, and Nursling and Rownhams, and in the Rural District of Winchester the parishes of Botley, Bursledon, Hamble, Hedge End, Hound, and West End.

1974–1983: The Boroughs of Eastleigh and Romsey, in the Rural District of Romsey and Stockbridge the parishes of Ampfield, Braishfield, Chilworth, Melchet Park and Plaitford, Michelmersh, North Baddesley, Nursling and Rownhams, Romsey Extra, Sherfield English, and Wellow, and in the Rural District of Winchester the parishes of Botley, Bursledon, Hamble, Hedge End, Hound, and West End.

1983–1997: The Borough of Eastleigh, and the City of Southampton ward of Woolston.

1997–2010: The Borough of Eastleigh wards of Bishopstoke, Botley, Bursledon, Eastleigh Central, Eastleigh North, Eastleigh South, Eastleigh West, Fair Oak, Hamble, Hedge End St John's, Hedge End Wildern, Hound, West End North, and West End South.

2010–present: The Borough of Eastleigh wards of Bishopstoke East, Bishopstoke West, Botley, Bursledon and Old Netley, Eastleigh Central, Eastleigh North, Eastleigh South, Fair Oak and Horton Heath, Hamble-le-Rice and Butlocks Heath, Hedge End Grange Park, Hedge End St John's, Hedge End Wildern, Netley Abbey, West End North, and West End South.

The constituency lies in a long band east of Southampton in Hampshire that stretches from Eastleigh to the sailing centre of Hamble, and comprises all of the Borough of Eastleigh apart from part of the town of Chandler's Ford which is in the Winchester constituency.

History 
Eastleigh constituency was created for the 1955 general election; before then Eastleigh itself had been in the Winchester constituency. It was a fairly safe seat for the Conservatives for nearly forty years until the death of its then MP, former journalist Stephen Milligan, in 1994.  At the subsequent by-election, the Liberal Democrats gained the seat on a very large swing, and then held Eastleigh in the four following general elections (1997, 2001, 2005 and 2010), though with somewhat narrow majorities.

Chris Huhne, the MP from 2005 to 2013, was his party's environment spokesman in opposition, before becoming the Liberal Democrat senior spokesman for the Home Office (or Second Shadow Home Secretary).  While in the previous role Huhne stood unsuccessfully for party leader in 2006 against Menzies Campbell and again in 2007 against Nick Clegg.  Following the 2010 general election, Huhne joined the coalition government's cabinet as Secretary of State for Energy and Climate Change, but resigned as an MP in February 2013 after admitting perverting the course of justice over a speeding case. His resignation took effect from 5 February, and the following day it was confirmed that a by-election to fill the vacancy would be held on 28 February 2013. Mike Thornton retained the seat for the Liberal Democrats in the by-election. However, at the 2015 general election Thornton was defeated by the Conservative Mims Davies. Since then the seat has been held by the Conservatives.

Members of Parliament

Elections

Elections in the 2010s

Elections in the 2000s

Elections in the 1990s

Elections in the 1980s

Elections in the 1970s

Elections in the 1960s

Elections in the 1950s

See also 
 List of parliamentary constituencies in Hampshire

Notes

References

Parliamentary constituencies in Hampshire
Constituencies of the Parliament of the United Kingdom established in 1955
Politics of the Borough of Eastleigh